Peter Paul Sidorkiewicz (born June 29, 1963) is a Polish-born Canadian former professional ice hockey goaltender. Sidorkiewicz played in the National Hockey League (NHL) with the Hartford Whalers, Ottawa Senators, and New Jersey Devils, representing the Wales Conference in the 1993 NHL All-Star Game. Since retiring as a player, Sidorkiewicz has worked for the Norfolk Admirals of the ECHL as a coach and player personnel director.

Junior hockey

Oshawa Generals (1980–1984)
Sidorkiewicz joined the Oshawa Generals of the OHL in 1980–81, going 3–3–0 with a 4.68 GAA in seven games.  Sidorkiewicz also saw some playing time in the post-season, going 2–2 with a 4.51 GAA in five games.

Sidorkiewicz saw his playing time increase during the 1981–82 season, playing in 29 games with the Generals, earning a 14–11–1 record with a 4.75 GAA.  Sidorkiewicz would only see action in one playoff game, going 0–0 with a 4.62 GAA in 13 minutes of playing time.

He became the Generals starting goaltender in 1982–83, as in 60 games, Sidorkiewicz posted a 36–20–3 record with a 3.61 GAA.  In the playoffs, Sidorkiewicz helped lead the Generals to the J. Ross Robertson Cup by posting a 15–1–1 record with a 3.68 GAA in 17 games, as the Generals qualified for the 1983 Memorial Cup.  In the Memorial Cup, Oshawa would make it to the final game, however, lost to the Portland Winterhawks.  In the tournament, Sidorkiewicz had a 3–2 record with a 5.12 GAA in five games.

Sidorkiewicz returned to the Generals for the 1983–84 season, going 28–21–1 with a 5.06 GAA in 52 games with Oshawa.  In the post-season, he had a 3–4 record with a 3.86 GAA in seven games, as the Generals lost in the quarter-finals.

Professional career

Washington Capitals (1984–1985)
Sidorkiewicz was drafted by the Washington Capitals in the fifth round, 91st overall, at the 1981 NHL Entry Draft.  In 10 games with the Capitals IHL affiliate, the Fort Wayne Komets, Sidorkiewicz had a 4–4–2 record with a 4.37 GAA.  He then joined the Binghamton Whalers, the Capitals AHL affiliate that they shared with the Hartford Whalers.

On March 12, 1985, Washington traded Sidorkiewicz and Dean Evason to the Hartford Whalers for David Jensen.

Hartford Whalers (1985–1992)
When Sidorkiewicz was acquired by the Hartford Whalers from the Washington Capitals, he remained with the Binghamton Whalers of the AHL, as the two clubs shared the team.  Sidorkiewicz had an impressive 1984–85 season with Binghamton, going 31–9–5 with a 3.05 GAA in 45 games.  In the post-season, Sidorkiewicz went 4–4 with a 3.87 GAA in eight games with the AHL Whalers.

In 1985–86, Sidorkiewicz had a 21–22–3 record with a 3.19 GAA in 49 games with Binghamton, helping the club reach the playoffs.  In four post-season games, Sidorkiewicz had a 1–3 record with a 3.06 GAA.

Sidorkiewicz had a very solid 1986–87 with Binghamton, earning a 23–16–0 record in 57 games with a 2.92 GAA and a .889 save percentage.  In the playoffs, Sidorkiewicz had a 6–7 record with a 2.72 GAA in 13 games.

Sidorkiewicz returned to Binghamton for the 1987–88, going 19–17–3 with a 3.68 GAA in 42 games, helping the club reach the post-season.  In three playoff games, Sidorkiewicz was 0–2 with a 3.27 GAA.  Sidorkiewicz also saw his NHL debut in 1987–88, as he started for the Hartford Whalers on October 16, 1987 against the Washington Capitals.  Sidorkiewicz made 30 saves in his NHL debut, however, suffered a 6–2 loss to Washington in his only NHL game for the season.

Sidorkiewicz would stay in the NHL for good in 1988–89, as he began the season as the back-up goaltender with Hartford, playing behind Mike Liut.  On October 15, 1988, Sidorkiewicz earned his first career NHL victory, defeating the Chicago Blackhawks 7–5 at the Hartford Civic Center.  On December 6, 1988, Sidorkiewicz earned his first career shutout, as the Whalers crushed the Buffalo Sabres by a score of 9–0.  With Liut suffering through injuries, Sidorkiewicz became the Whalers starting goaltender by the end of the season.  Overall, in 44 games, Sidorkiewicz had a 22–18–4 record with a 3.03 GAA and a .890 save percentage, as well as four shutouts, helping the Whalers make the playoffs.  In two playoff games, Sidorkiewicz went 0–2 with a 3.87 GAA and a .822 save percentage as the club was swept by the Montreal Canadiens in the Adams Division semi-finals.  Sidorkiewicz finished fourth in Calder Memorial Trophy voting, and 11th in Vezina Trophy voting.

Sidorkiewicz began the 1989–90 season splitting his playing time with Liut, however, the Whalers traded Liut to the Washington Capitals on March 6, 1990, making Sidorkiewicz the undisputed number one goaltender in Hartford.  In 46 games, Sidorkiewicz had a 19–19–7 record with a 3.57 GAA and .866 save percentage.  In seven playoff games, Sidorkiewicz went 3–4 with a 3.22 GAA and .881 save percentage as the Whalers lost a thrilling seven game series against the Boston Bruins.

In 1990–91, Sidorkiewicz helped the Whalers reach the post-season, as in 52 games, he posted a 21–22–7 record with a 3.33 GAA and .872 save percentage.  In six playoff games, he had a 2–4 record with a 4.01 GAA and .862 save percentage as Hartford lost to the Boston Bruins for the second straight season.

Sidorkiewicz suffered through a poor and injury plagued 1991–92 season, going 9–19–6 with a 3.34 GAA and a .882 save percentage in 35 games.

On June 18, 1992, Sidorkiewicz was claimed by the Ottawa Senators in the 1992 NHL Expansion Draft.

Ottawa Senators (1992–1993)
Sidorkiewicz joined the Ottawa Senators for their first season in 1992–93.  He started the first game in Senators history, earning the win as Ottawa defeated the Montreal Canadiens 5–3.  Sidorkiewicz appeared in a career high 64 games with the Senators, going 8–46–3 with a 4.43 GAA and .856 save percentage.  Sidorkiewicz appeared in the 44th National Hockey League All-Star Game held at the Montreal Forum, as he earned the victory in a 16–6 win for the Wales Conference over the Campbell Conference.

On June 20, 1993, the Senators traded Sidorkiewicz and future considerations to the New Jersey Devils for Craig Billington and Troy Mallette.

New Jersey Devils (1993–1998)
Sidorkiewicz saw very little action with the New Jersey Devils in 1993–94, as he appeared in only three games, going 0–3–0 with a 2.77 GAA and a .891 save percentage.  He spent the remainder of the season splitting time between the Albany River Rats of the AHL, as he had a 6–7–2 record with a 3.97 GAA in 15 games, and the Fort Wayne Komets of the IHL, where in 11 games he went 6–3–0 with a 2.74 GAA and two shutouts.  In 18 playoff games with the Komets, Sidorkiewicz went 10–8 with a 3.36 GAA.

Sidorkiewicz remained with the Komets for the 1994–95 season, going 8–6–1 with a 3.70 GAA and .879 save percentage in 16 games.  In three playoff games, he went 1–2 with a 5.00 GAA.

He returned to the Albany River Rats in 1995–96, as Sidorkiewicz had a 19–7–5 record with 2.95 GAA and .898 save percentage in 32 games.  In one playoff game, he had a 0–1 record with a 3.05 GAA.

Sidorkiewicz became the River Rats starting goaltender in 1996–97, earning a 31–23–6 record in 62 games, while posting a 2.90 GAA and a .901 save percentage.  In 16 playoff games, he had a 7–8 record with a 3.13 GAA.

In 1997–98, Sidorkiewicz appeared in 43 games with Albany, going 21–15–5 with a 2.85 GAA and a .896 save percentage.  In two playoff games, Sidorkiewicz had a 1–1 record with a 4.04 GAA.  Sidorkiewicz also appeared in one NHL game in 1997–98, playing the third period, as he allowed a goal, in a 6–2 loss to the Chicago Blackhawks.

After the season, Sidorkiewicz retired from hockey.

Coaching career

Erie Otters (1999–2013)
Sidorkiewicz became an assistant coach with the Erie Otters in 1999, and remained in this position until he was named the Otters head coach prior to the 2006-07 OHL season.

In his first season as the Otters head coach, Sidorkiewicz led the rebuilding club to a 15–50–3 record, failing to qualify for the playoffs.

In 2007–08, Sidorkiewicz returned as head coach of the team, however, after a 3–12–0 start, he resigned from the position and returned to his previous job as an assistant, as the Otters hired Robbie Ftorek as head coach.

Sidorkiewicz continued as an assistant coach on the Otters until March 23, 2013.

Dornbirner EC (2014–2017)
In August 2014, Sidorkiewicz was named assistant coach of Dornbirner EC of the Austrian Hockey League (EBEL) and he remained with the team for three seasons.

In the 2016-17, Sidorkiewicz was named head coach of the team. Dornbirner had a record of 21-24-9, finishing in 9th place in the league standings with 72 points. Dornbirner failed to qualify for the post-season.

Norfolk Admirals (2017–2019)
Prior to the 2017–18 ECHL season, Sidorkiewicz joined the Norfolk Admirals as an assistant coach, where he was reunited with head coach Robbie Ftorek after working together while they were both part of the Erie Otters coaching staff. After the 2018–19 season concluded, both Sidorkiewicz and Ftorek were released.

Coaching record

Awards and achievements
Memorial Cup Tournament All-Star Team (1983)
AHL Second All-Star Team (1987)
NHL All-Rookie Team (1989)
NHL All-Star Game (1993)

Career statistics

Regular season and playoffs

International

References

External links

1963 births
Living people
Albany River Rats players
Binghamton Whalers players
Canadian ice hockey coaches
Canadian ice hockey goaltenders
Erie Otters coaches
Hartford Whalers players
Ice hockey people from Ontario
National Hockey League All-Stars
New Jersey Devils players
Oshawa Generals players
Ottawa Senators players
People from Sokółka County
Polish emigrants to Canada
Sportspeople from Oshawa
Sportspeople from Podlaskie Voivodeship
Washington Capitals draft picks